Anse-Rouge (literally Red Bay) is a commune in the Gros-Morne Arrondissement, in the Artibonite department of Haiti.

References

Populated places in Artibonite (department)
Communes of Haiti